Elections for 680 of the 1,228 delegates to the Great National Assembly of Alba Iulia took place in Transylvania and neighbouring regions of the Hungarian Democratic Republic inhabited by Romanians between November 20 and December 1, 1918. Voting procedure was highly irregular, ranging from universal vote direct vote to indirect elections and even acclamation by local self-proclaimed "Romanian national councils".

History
News about the armistice of Belgrade reach the Romanian (Transylvanian) delegation. The National Romanian Central Council retreats from negotiations and decides to hold elections and convey for  the Great National Assembly, and to hand power to the latter. 
November 1918 - During a 12-day interval, elections are held for the Great National Assembly. Its 1,228 members are elected 5 each from the electoral districts established in 1910 (600 members in total), and 628 to represent different social, professional and cultural organizations (clergy, teachers' unions, military). The local enthusiasm gains momentum, as demands such as land reform, universal vote, and possible union with Romania are put forward.
On December 1, 1918 (November 18 Old Style), the Great National Assembly, consisting of 1,228 elected representatives of the Romanians in Transylvania, Banat, Crișana and Maramureș, convened in Alba Iulia (Gyulafehérvár) and decreed (by unanimous vote) the Union of Transylvania with Romania

See also
 1917 Bessarabian legislative election

References

External links
 UNIREA TRANSILVANIEI CU ROMÂNIA 

Election
20th century in Transylvania
Elections in Romania
Romania
November 1918 events
December 1918 events